Hande Soral Demirci (born 22 February 1987) is a Turkish-Cypriot actress.

Life and career
Originally from İnegöl, she completed her primary, secondary, and postsecondary education there, graduating from the Department of Psychology at the Bilgi University in Istanbul. Her career as an actress began when she appeared as a guest actor, in 2008, for a part on "Komedi Dükkanı" comedy improvisation series. This eventually led to offers of other roles from the show's producer when the program ended. 

Her breakthrough role is in popular series Küçük Kadınlar. She played in "Yılanların Öcü" based from novel. From 2018-2019, she was a lead actress in season 5 of Diriliş: Ertuğrul alongside Engin Altan Düzyatan. In 2021, she played the character of Ümit in Bir Zamanlar Çukurova series. Her other period series are "Bir Günah Gibi", "Fatih", "Çalıkuşu".

Personal life
Hande Soral married İsmail Demirci on 14 October 2017. She has a son whose name is Ali. Born 2022

Filmography

References

External links
 
 

1987 births
Living people
People from Bursa
Turkish film actresses
Turkish television actresses
21st-century Turkish actresses
Istanbul Bilgi University alumni